Scott Michael Rueck (born July 18, 1969) is the head coach of the Oregon State University women's basketball team.

Early life
Rueck grew up in Hillsboro, Oregon, where he graduated from Glencoe High School. His father had been the first boys' basketball coach at Glencoe and had also been a coach at Hillsboro High School. After high school, he attended Oregon State University in Corvallis where he graduated with a bachelor's degree in exercise and sports science in 1991. While at OSU he started his coaching career at Santiam Christian High School in nearby Adair Village where he was an assistant with the boys' basketball team from 1989 until 1993. In 1992, he earned a master's degree from Oregon State in physical education.

Coaching career
In 1993, Rueck took an assistant coach position at George Fox University in Newberg, Oregon, with the women's basketball team. Rueck then became the head coach of the women's team in 1996, and also coached the women's tennis team from 1995 to 1996. While at George Fox, Rueck had coached the Bruins to an 85–8 record from 2007 to 2010 and was named the Northwest Conference’s top coach for the fourth consecutive season. In 2009, Rueck guided the Bruins to a 32–0 record and the NCAA Division III national title. That year he was also named national coach of the year for Division III women's basketball. Overall, he had a 288–88 win–loss record in his 14 years as coach at George Fox.

Rueck was named coach of the Beavers in July 2010 to replace LaVonda Wagner.

Rueck has led the Beavers to each of the last seven NCAA tournaments, winning at least one game each year. On March 28, 2016; his team defeated Kim Mulkey's Baylor Bears 60–57 to secure their first ever trip to the NCAA Final Four in Indianapolis to play against one of the top teams in the country; Geno Auriemma's Connecticut Huskies on April 3. The Beavers closed out the season with an 80–51 defeat to eventual champ UConn Huskies to finish their season at 32–5. The 32 wins season were the most in women's basketball program history and the Beavers finished their season ranked #2 in the nation.

Personal life
Rueck is married to the former Kerry Aillaud.  They have three children, Cole (18), Kate (15), and Macey (10).

Head coaching record

References 

1969 births
Living people
Basketball coaches from Oregon
George Fox University faculty
High school basketball coaches in the United States
Oregon State Beavers women's basketball coaches
Oregon State University alumni
Sportspeople from Hillsboro, Oregon
American women's basketball coaches